Abdoulaye M'Baye (born 13 November 1973) is a Senegalese former professional football striker who played abroad in Morocco, Tunisia, Norway and China and for the national team.

Club career
M'Baye purportedly started his career in ASC Diaraf, and then played in Morocco for Stade Marocain, Wydad de Fès and WAC Casablanca. M'Baye joined Club Africain in 1999, but went on to European football and Tromsø IL in June 2000. The transfer reportedly went through after agent Jon Thorstensen used singer Jørn Hoel as a liaison towards Tromsø. In the 2001 Tippeligaen he became Tromsø's top scorer with 6 goals, but the team was relegated.

In 2002 he left Tromsø, first going on trial with IK Start where he scored in four pre-season friendlies in a row. Set to sign for Start according to an interview on 6 March, two days later the same newspaper reported his signing for Chinese Shanghai Zhongyuan Huili. He scored 8 goals, but only carried out one year of his contract. In 2003 he did not play competitively for the first eight months of the year, until being signed by Vålerenga Fotball for the remainder of the season. In March 2005 he joined Aalesunds FK on a one-year contract. After fulfilling it he moved home to Senegal to commence various business ventures.

International career
M'Baye was capped for Senegal and was a squad member for the 2000 African Cup of Nations.

References

1973 births
Living people
Senegalese footballers
ASC Jaraaf players
Wydad AC players
Wydad de Fès players
Club Africain players
Tromsø IL players
Beijing Renhe F.C. players
Vålerenga Fotball players
Aalesunds FK players
Senegalese expatriate footballers
Expatriate footballers in Morocco
Senegalese expatriate sportspeople in Morocco
Expatriate footballers in Tunisia
Senegalese expatriate sportspeople in Tunisia
Expatriate footballers in Norway
Senegalese expatriate sportspeople in Norway
Expatriate footballers in China
Senegalese expatriate sportspeople in China
Eliteserien players
Senegal international footballers
2000 African Cup of Nations players
Association football forwards